Disklavier  is a brand of reproducing pianos manufactured by Yamaha Corporation. The first Disklavier was introduced in the United States in 1987.

The typical Disklavier is a real acoustic piano outfitted with electronic sensors for recording and electromechanical solenoids for player piano-style playback. Sensors record the movements of the keys, hammers, and pedals during a performance, and the system saves the performance data as a Standard MIDI File (SMF). On playback, the solenoids move the keys and pedals and thus reproduce the original performance.

Modern Disklaviers typically include an array of electronic features, such as a built-in tone generator for playing back MIDI accompaniment tracks, speakers, MIDI connectivity that supports communication with computing devices and external MIDI instruments, additional ports for audio and SMPTE I/O, and Internet connectivity. Historically, a variety of devices have been used to control or operate the instrument, including buttons on a control box mounted on the piano, infrared handheld controllers, handheld wi-fi controllers, a Java application that runs on a personal computer, and apps that run on iOS-based portable devices.

Disklaviers have been manufactured in the form of upright, baby grand, and grand piano styles (including a nine-foot concert grand). Reproducing systems have ranged from relatively simple, playback-only models to the PRO models which record performance data at resolutions that exceed the limits of normal MIDI data. From the late 1990s into the early 2000s, Yamaha also produced a GranTouch series of Disklaviers that were digital pianos with a grand piano action. In addition to recording, the GranTouch instruments were capable of playing back performances with moving keys although the moving keys were not necessary for the electronic reproduction of sound.

Model history

Early models 
Prior to the introduction of the Disklavier in the United States, Yamaha Corporation of Japan debuted an upright reproducing instrument in 1982 called "Piano Player". It featured a record-and-playback system, floppy disk storage of performance data, and the ability to playback multi-track performance files that included instrumental tracks whose sound was reproduced by a tone generator.  There was also an upright model sold in Japan in 1985 known as the MX100R.

The first model introduced in the United States was the studio model upright MX100A in 1987 (easiest way to identify this model is the LED Display on the front of the piano is red whilst all later models were changed to green or as in the case of the current E3, a white display). Shortly thereafter, it was slightly modified and renamed MX100B. This early upright was followed by the first grand piano model in 1989.

A third, early model series was introduced in the early 1990s in small uprights and was known as the MX80 series. Like the MX100A, MX100B, and Wagon Grand, the MX80 recorded on  double-density floppy disks and recorded performances in a Yamaha-proprietary file format called E-SEQ, a forerunner of the subsequent industry-standard file format known as Standard MIDI Files. All of these instruments featured ports for MIDI input and output.

Technical innovations found on these early model instruments included hammer sensors for recording (MX100A, MX100B, and Wagon Grand), recording and playback of incremental pedal data (Wagon Grand), and moving pedals during playback (all models).

Mark II, Mark IIXG  
The next generation of Disklaviers began with the Mark II in 1992. Standard features included hammers sensors for recording, support for recording and playback of incremental pedal data, and support for the emerging industry standard file format called Standard MIDI Files.

Upgrade kits became available to update Mark II pianos to include the Mark IIXG features. This included the DSR1 module which gave wagon grand, MX100A/B and Mark II disklavier owners most of the features of the Mark IIXG however it didn't change the fundamental recording and playback accuracy of the solenoids or sensors of those early systems.

During the Mark II and Mark IIXG era, various models of uprights were introduced that included a silent system. When the silent system was engaged, the hammers were prevented from hitting the strings and the instrument produced no sound acoustically. The player was able to wear a headset and hear themselves play as though they were playing a digital piano with the sound of a nine-foot concert grand. Some Disklavier uprights with this system also contained a Celeste or practice pedal which when engaged brought a rail with a curtain of felt between the hammers and the strings thus significantly reducing the volume of the acoustic piano. This feature could also be used whilst the disklavier system was being used however this feature was a very rare option for pianos with a silent system fitted.

Mark III 
The Mark III system followed in 2000. The Mark III included a variety of underlying technical improvements to the record and playback system. An especially noteworthy improvement was its ability to play back performances at very low volume levels. Additional user features included recording and playback of synchronous audio tracks, playback of specially encoded CD-ROM disks from a built-in CD player, and the SmartKey system that provided a play-along feature in which the user is prompted to press silently wiggling keys. The Mark III also introduced support for video-sync recording and playback based on the generation and reception of MIDI Time Code.  Another upgrade known as the DCD1 was available that could provide early Disklavier owners with a CD drive for reading Cd's like the Mk III.

Pro 
In 1999, near the end of the Mark IIXG model series, Yamaha introduced the Disklavier PRO. A key selling feature of this model was the claim of greater recording and playback accuracy than had been possible with previously available models. These instruments recorded not only hammer velocity (as MIDI note-on velocity) but key down velocity and key up velocity (MIDI note-off velocity) as well. The instrument was also capable of recording and reproducing key movements that resulted in no audible sound.

Before the PRO, Disklaviers were limited by design, like all MIDI keyboard instruments, to working within a 0–127 range of values for note-on velocity, note-off velocity, and incremental pedal movement. To break this accuracy limit, Yamaha's Disklavier engineers pioneered a unique use of normally undefined MIDI controllers for the purpose of substantially extending the range of values for note-on/note-off to 0–1023 and for pedal movement to 0–255. In Disklavier lingo, this "extended precision" data was referred to as "XP" data.

The recording and reproduction quality of the PRO have been validated by the International Piano-e-Competition, formerly known as the Minnesota International Piano-e-Competition. In 2002, the Piano-e-Competition used the Disklavier PRO on two continents to enable Yefim Bronfman to participate as a member of the competition jury from Hamamatsu, Japan, 6,000 miles from where the competition was taking place in St. Paul, MN. Following each solo performance, synchronized MIDI and video files were transmitted over the Internet, and Bronfman was able to watch performances on a large screen while the local piano reproduced the playing.

Since that time, the Disklavier PRO has been used by the competition to enable pianists to participate in a screening-round of the competition ("virtual auditions") by submitting a video-synchronized performance recorded on a Disklavier PRO. All rounds of the competition are recorded on the PRO and made available as downloadable files from the competition's website.

The original PRO was the first model Disklavier grand to include the silent system. Ever since the instrument's introduction during the Mark IIXG model era, newer versions of the PRO have been available in subsequent model series and have been known as Mark III PRO, Mark IV PRO, and E3 PRO.

Disklavier PRO 2000 
In celebration of its 100th year of piano manufacturing, Yamaha debuted a concept piano called the Disklavier PRO 2000. The instrument's unusual physical design featured cherry wood, aluminum chassis material, a clear split lid, and a built-in Windows computer with a touch-screen monitor. Internally, this  piano with a AAA–c (88 keys) compass was based on the Mark III PRO Disklavier system.

The instrument offered a glimpse into the future of Disklavier and piano manufacturing. This was the first Disklavier to support playback of video-synchronized recordings. There was a performance mode that enabled a player to layer a variety of independently zoned sounds on top of their playing, and the built-in computer offered a program called Home Concert 2000 from TimeWarp Technologies that was capable of displaying music on the screen, tracking the performer, turning the pages automatically, and outputting a coordinated accompaniment.

Only nine of these pianos were built. The suggested retail price was $333,000, which made the instrument the most expensive Disklavier ever produced.

Mark IV 
Introduced in 2004, the Mark IV series of Disklaviers was available in grand pianos only. The Mark IV series overlapped the Mark III model era.

The control system for the Mark IV was built on an embedded Linux operating system, and it offered a wi-fi-based PDA-style controller (PRC100) as well as an optional tablet-style controller. The instrument had an Ethernet port which enabled it to be connected to a local area network. There was also an embedded Java application known as the Virtual PRC which could be accessed and run on Mac and Windows computers that were on the same network as the piano. In January 2011, Yamaha expanded the control features of the instrument by offering a free iOS application that was able to control the instrument over the local network.

Other features of the instrument included an 80-gigabyte hard drive, an unobtrusive console, located under the left side of the keyboard, an expanded array of audio ports, support for USB storage devices, and support for USB MIDI communications. Another enhancement of the Disklavier system was the support for SMPTE time code generation and reception, enabling the recording and playback of video-synchronized performance without additional hardware.

Although firmware updates had been available occasionally for earlier models of Disklavier, the Mark IV's Linux-based system was capable of being updated over the Internet. As of 2014, the Mark IV is using the 4th generation of its operating system.

Along with system updates to the Mark IV, Yamaha expanded the functionality of the instrument via the Internet. In 2006, the 2.0 system update was accompanied by the additional ability to purchase recorded performances using the remote controller of the instrument as well as the opportunity to subscribe to a new cloud-based service called DisklavierRadio. DisklavierRadio (sometimes known as Piano Radio) offers a number of "channels" that can be received as performance data streams that are reproduced by the instrument itself.

In 2013, Yamaha combined the built-in technologies of video-synchronized playback and the streaming capabilities of DisklavierRadio and offered customers an additional service called DisklavierTV. DisklavierTV is powered by Yamaha's RemoteLive technology and enables the reception of broadcasts that include video and audio as well as performance data that drives the playback of the piano itself.

Yamaha has offered a large number of DisklavierTV concerts to its Mark IV and E3 customers, including performances by Elton John and Sarah McLachlan, performances from the Monterey Jazz Festival, Newport Music Festival, and the International Piano-e-Competition. Much of this content is also made available on-demand, allowing customers to receive these concerts whenever they would like.

E3 
The E3 Disklavier system was introduced in 2009 while the Mark IV system was still in production, and in the United States, both systems were offered at the same time. Although there was some system overlap in several piano models, the E3 system was only available in smaller grand pianos— and smaller. In 2012, Yamaha ended production of the Mark IV system, and in the U.S., the E3 became available in virtually all Yamaha grand pianos and a studio model upright piano (DU1E3).

During the time that the Mark IV was still in production, the available E3 models had a less sophisticated and less costly record-and-playback system. In the US, these larger models are only available with the PRO system, and today, the E3 PRO represents the most advanced Disklavier to date. The control unit for the E3 more closely resembles the control unit of the Mark II, Mark IIXG, and Mark III systems although it is the first Disklavier system that does not include an internal floppy drive. The instrument is controlled by an infrared, handheld remote. Like the Mark IV, the E3 can be connected to a local area network via Ethernet cable and then be controlled by a wireless app running on an iOS device. Like the Mark IV, the E3 enjoys the same cloud-based services such as firmware updates, DisklavierRadio, and DisklavierTV.

In order to bring many older model Disklaviers up to the same or similar feature set as the E3, Yamaha introduced the DKC-850 replacement control unit for Mark IIXG and Mark III Disklaviers in 2010. Outwardly, the control unit looks and functions identically to the E3 control unit and provides access to the same cloud-based services, though it does not upgrade the tone generator and has substantially fewer performance/editing features compared with the original control units. The DKC-850 can also update earlier model Disklaviers by connecting to the old control unit via MIDI cables. In this context, the DKC-850 does not support the reception of streaming performances.

Disklavier ENSPIRE
In January 2016, Yamaha introduced its seventh-generation Disklavier, the Disklavier ENSPIRE. Replacing the Disklavier E3, the ENSPIRE remains the only fully integrated, factory-installed reproducing piano available that can both natively play and record a piano performance.

The ENSPIRE is available in 14 models ranging from  upright pianos to a  concert grand and is offered in three system variations – CL, ST and PRO. The CL introduces a "playback only" model omitting the recording and "silent system" functionality that are offered in ST and PRO models. Currently, the CL type ENSPIRE is only offered in Yamaha's entry-level grand piano, the GB1K, and is only sold in certain markets.

ST models include a non-contact optical sensing system, featuring continuous grayscale shutters for each key and optical window style shutters on each hammer. Optical sensors are also used for the damper, soft and sostenuto pedals. This sensor system allows the user to natively capture their own performance in standard MIDI format, without the need for external or special software. In addition, a "silent system" that does not require special installation or instrument modification is added to allow for headphone connectivity and access to the instrument's digital sounds, which include a special binaurally captured CFX Concert Grand sample. Because piano components and solenoids can be affected by environmental changes, a patented DSP servo drive system that monitors and controls key and pedal movement to ensure accurate performance reproduction is active during playback. This DSP system provides feedback to the instrument's processor effectively making the system a "closed-loop". If the system detects any physical movement that does not correlate with the provided performance data, it will automatically adjust itself to correct any deviation in real-time.

PRO models are high-resolution systems equipped with non-contact optical sensors as well, but also incorporate continuous grayscale shutters on each hammer to measure their speed and distance. The addition of continuous grayscale shutters for each hammer allows for even greater recording and performance accuracy allowing the user to natively record and playback high-resolution performances with 1024 levels of key and hammer velocity as well as 256 increments of positional pedaling using Yamaha's proprietary XP format. ENSPIRE PRO models also utilize Yamaha's AccuPlay technology, an advanced DSP servo drive system that monitors the important mechanical elements of the piano during performance reproduction. In PRO type models, AccuPlay will monitor the movements of the keys, hammers, pedals and solenoids. Like the ST type, data fed back to the playback processor from the instrument's sensing system is used to ensure accurate reproduction of the original performance. Currently, no other system on the market utilizes this type of technology.

Aesthetic changes have been made to the Disklavier ENSPIRE, including the removal of the "box" style user interface featured in past generations. While tactile functionality and controls still exist on the instrument itself, the control panel is almost invisible to the user. Operationally, all functions and features can be accessed by any compatible HTML5 browser; however, Yamaha recommends using an Apple iOS device or Android device.

The instrument comes with 500 built-in songs, many of which are in Yamaha's PianoSoft Audio format. The PianoSoft Audio format, currently only compatible with Disklavier ENSPIRE, features stereo audio recordings that play in sync with piano performances. The main differentiation between this format when compared to the older PianoSoft Plus Audio format or when compared to competitor's offerings is that the audio recordings are in true stereo, not mono. Included in the built-in song library are performances by Yamaha artists such as Sarah McLachlan, Bob James, Jamie Cullum and Frederic Chiu. In addition to the built-in songs, users have access to over 6,000 additional titles for purchase through the Yamaha MusicSoft online store, directly accessible through the instrument's user interface.

The Disklavier ENSPIRE also offers Internet streaming services including PANDORA style Disklavier Radio, which currently provides users with over 30 channels of streaming piano music 24 hours a day, seven days a week. Along with Disklavier Radio, users can also access DisklavierTV, a video streaming service that allows users to view live and on-demand musical performances that play in sync with their piano.

Additional Disklavier ENSPIRE features include:

An included USB Wi-Fi adaptor (UD-WL01) that allows for peer-to-peer connectivity with a mobile device or connectivity to a network via WPS
Automatic system calibration and troubleshooting
Instruments do not require special maintenance or piano action regulation to play properly
Digital tone generator with 16 playable voices and 480 ensemble voices (256-note polyphony)
Direct to USB audio recording function
V-sync technology which allows users to create video recordings that sync to recorded piano performances using a standard camcorder or mobile device
USB storage connectivity
MIDI connectivity via standard MIDI ports or USB
Coaxial digital output

Specialized uses 
In 2006, Matthew Teeter and Chris Dobrian, researchers at the University of California, Irvine, developed third-party Disklavier software controller running on Windows, Mac and Linux operating systems, which replicated the functionality provided by the PDA/Tablet PC remotes. The software and its source code were made freely available. In November 2007, Kevin Goroway used that example code to create DKVBrowser which is an open source project. This software is also multiplatform, and has provided features that are not available on the proprietary interfaces provided by Yamaha, such as wildcard searching.

The software running on the Disklavier Mark IV and Mark IV PRO onboard Linux control computer continues to undergo development and the manufacturer makes firmware updates available to users.

As with other MIDI instruments, one potential benefit of the readily edited MIDI data output by a Disklavier is in the professional recording domain, where a recorded performance could be edited, allowing the correction of minor errors after a take.

Artistic uses 
At the end of the 80's, the researcher and composer Jean-Claude Risset, from the Laboratoire de mécanique et d'acoustique de Marseille, became interested in the Disklavier for his research and compositions. He composed Duet For One Pianist in 1989, a set of pieces for piano, where the notes played by the pianist are processed by an algorithm before being sent back to the Disklavier in real time. With his team, including doctor and pianist Simon Bolzinger, he developed DKompose, a library for interactive composition with DiskKlavier in the Max/MSP environment. The library includes elementary operations used in Risset's pieces such as note symmetry, note delay, and arpeggiation.

In his 2015 album Music For Choking Disklavier, musician and composer Hans Tammen focuses on the Disklavier's own sonic qualities, namely the sounds of the mechanics. To do this, he uses notes with such low dynamics that the piano hammer does not strike the string, leaving only the sounds of the piano's mechanics and motors to be perceived. He voluntarily recorded his album by placing microphones at the level of the hammers, activated by the motors. He says that the title of the album "Choking Disklavier" comes from the fact that the MIDI signal processor could stop for a few seconds due to the overload of incoming data.

Texan composer Kyle Gann composed several pieces for the Disklavier. On the one hand, this allows him to compose rhythms that are unplayable for a pianist, but it also allows him to compose microtonal music on the piano, as in Hyperchromatica, released in 2018, where he uses three Disklaviers tuned to intervals smaller than a semitone. This allows him to compose on 243 piano notes instead of 88, controlling the three pianos via MIDI protocol.

In 2018, pianist Dan Tepfer released Natural Machines, a video album posted on YouTube. Dan Tepfer processes MIDI data in real time as he plays the Disklavier, creating a duet between pianist and machine. In the manner of Jean-Claude Risset, what he plays can for example be repeated as in a mirror game or perform unplayable tremolo. His performances are accompanied by abstract visualization programs, evoking the algorithmic principles used in his performances.

Educational and professional applications 
The Disklavier has been used extensively in music education, including colleges, universities, conservatories, community music schools, K-12 institutions, and private studios. Applications include:

 record/playback of student performances which enable a student to listen critically to their own playing
 interactive play-along with pre-recorded, pedagogical accompaniment files
 practice of piano concerto repertoire using score-following software, such as Home Concert Xtreme, developed by TimeWarp Technologies
 use of the instrument as a MIDI input device with compositional software
 algorithmic compositions that involve interactivity between performer and computer using software such as Max/MSP from Cycling '74
 multimedia performance using VJ-style software such as Arkaos Grand VJ from Arkaos
 piano accompaniments for singers and instrumentalists

In recognition of its contributions to the field of piano pedagogy, the Music Teachers National Conference and the Frances Clark Institute awarded the Disklavier the MTNA Frances Clark Keyboard Pedagogy Award in 2006.

In 1997, Yamaha undertook a successful, large-scale experiment that connected MIDI instruments together over the Internet, enabling Ryuichi Sakamoto to transmit a keyboard performance to thousands of locations simultaneously. The next year, Yamaha announced a new technology called MidLive RS that developed this concept further, incorporating MIDI data into the RealSystem G2 video/audio SDK provided by RealNetworks. This technology enabled a Disklavier performance in one part of the world to be accurately reproduced in near real time on a similar instrument elsewhere in the world.

Although those early efforts did not directly result in a commercial product, Yamaha continued to explore real-time transmission of Disklavier performances over the Internet. In 2007, Yamaha introduced "Remote Lesson" at the Winter NAMM show. Since then, educators at schools all over the U.S. have undertaken long distance lessons and master classes using the Remote Lesson technology.

Remote Lesson is a feature that is available exclusively in Mark IV and E3 pianos and is available to select educators and institutions. Similar capability is available in a software program called Internet MIDI that was developed by TimeWarp Technologies. Internet MIDI will connect Disklaviers with other Disklaviers as well as with other MIDI keyboard instruments.

When Disklavier pianos are connected over the Internet, there is some amount of delay that is introduced by virtue of the routing of Internet communications as well as the normal buffering of real-time data. In addition, the instrument itself introduces a mechanical delay of about a quarter of a second between the time that MIDI data is received and the moment when the hammers audibly impact the strings.

Although the delay is generally too great for the purpose of performing a traditional piano duet, the delay is adjustable to match the delay that is experienced during a video conference, using software such as Skype. In that context, the back-and-forth playing that takes place during a typical lesson is not impeded by the delay.

References

External links 

Yamaha Disklavier webpage
MIPeC Hi-Def and e-SEQ midibank  at Minnesota International Piano-e-Competition
Disklavier World Webpage and blog
Disklavier Software Webpage – Isadar – original new-age styled solo piano music in e-SEQ Disklavier format
Livecoding a Disklavier – playing a Disklavier with a computer program.
Lexikon-Sonate – interactive realtime composition for computer-controlled piano (Yamaha Disklavier) by Karlheinz Essl
PianoSoft Audio Format webpage

Mechanical musical instruments 
Piano
Yamaha music products